Roger de Piles's L'Abrégé de la vie des peintres...avec un traité du peintre parfait (The Art of Painting and the Lives of the Painters), was a major art biography of painters. It was written by the French spy Roger de Piles. In 1692, during the War of the League of Augsburg, he was arrested in the Hague carrying a false passport and imprisoned for the next five years, where he wrote his L'Abrégé in 7 parts; 1) Sketch of the perfect painter, 2) Greek painters; 3) Painters from Rome & Florence; 4) Painters from Venice; 5) Painters from Lombardy; 6) Painters from Germany and the Low Countries; 7) Painters from France and ending with his famous "Balance of painters". The book was finally published in 1699 following his appointment as Conseiller Honoraire to the Académie de peinture et de sculpture in Paris. 

Part 7, Painters from France, includes in order of appearance in the text, the following list of artists:

Jean Cousin the Elder (1500–1570), p 447
Jacob Bunel (1568–1614), p 449
Toussaint Dubreuil (1561–1602), p 449
Martin Fréminet (1567–1619), p 449
Ferdinand Elle (1570–1637), p 450
Quentin Varin (1584–1647), p 451
Jacques Blanchard (1600–1638), p 451
Simon Vouet (1590–1649), p 453
Nicolas Poussin (1594–1665), p 457
François Perrier (painter) (1590–1650), p 470
Jacques Stella (1596–1657), p 472
Martin de Charmois (1609–1661), p 475
Eustache Le Sueur (1616–1655), p 477
Laurent de La Hyre (1606–1656), p 479
Michel Dorigny (1617–1663), p 483
Charles Alphonse du Fresnoy (1611–1668), p 483
Nicolas Mignard (1606–1668), p 490
Claude Vignon (1593–1670), p 491
Sébastien Bourdon (1616–1671), p 492
Simon Francois (1606–1671), p 495
Philippe de Champaigne (1602–1673), p 497
Jean Baptiste de Champaigne (1631–1680), p 503
Nicolas-Pierre Loir (1624–1679), p 504
Charles Le Brun (1619–1690), p 505
Pierre Mignard (1612–1695), p 515
Claude Lorrain (1604–1682), p 521
Noël Coypel (1628–1707), p 523
Élisabeth Sophie Chéron (1648–1711), p 532
Carlo Maratta (1625–1713), p 542

External links

 Online version (French) of 1715 version Abregé de la Vie des peintres By Roger de Piles on Google Books 
 Online version (French) of 1715 Abregé de la Vie des peintres by Roger de Piles on Google Books 
 Version (Dutch) of 1725 translated by Johannes Verhoek "Beknopt verhaal van het Leven der Vermaardste Schilders" by Roger de Piles at the University of Utrecht 

French art historians
 
Art history books
Compilations of biographies about artists
1699 books